Buckmore Park Kart Circuit is an MSA approved outdoor kart racing circuit located just off junction 3 of the M2 in Chatham, Kent, England. Until his death on 10 March 2017, it was owned by John Surtees, the only person to have won world Grand Prix championships in both Formula One car racing and Grand Prix motorcycle racing.

Situated in a woodland setting between the M2 and M20 motorways directly above High Speed 1, its proximity to London makes it Britain's busiest circuit. With seven different fleets of kart the circuit offers karting experiences for all ages and experience levels.

Buckmore Park is a circuit where many current and past Formula One drivers learned their trade, including Johnny Herbert and Formula 1 champions Jenson Button and  Lewis Hamilton, who was originally discovered by Ron Dennis in the 1996 Champions of the Future Event held at Buckmore Park.

Although Buckmore Park is primarily a race circuit, it also has on-site conference and catering facilities.

Buckmore Kart Racing School 
The Buckmore Kart School has been preparing drivers for success in Motorsport since 1972 and has trained more than 20 European and British kart champions. There are both introductory and more in-depth training options for ages 8+. As well as a Bambino School & club for ages 6–7.

Types of Hire Event 

Buckmore Park is well known for its Hire Kart Club which regularly hosts events for its members. One type of event is 'Sprint' style racing, where competitors compete in a series of heats and finals. Starting positions for heats place each driver at the front, middle and rear of the grid for one race, whereas finals are decided by points acquired from finishing positions in heats.

Sprint events at Buckmore include the Grand Prix League, National Sprint, International Sprint and the two Junior Kart Club classes.

Some individual competitors prefer 'Endurance' races, where grid positions are decided by a short qualifying session, leading to the fastest driver starting on pole. Races are then usually an hour long and include the Solo 30 enduro, Solo 45enduro, Man Of Steel and the Iron Man.

Team races are also popular, and work in the same way as Endurance races but include fuel stops and driver changes.

Popular team events include the 3 hour (3 hours using RT8 390cc karts for 2-4 drivers) and the 6 hour team endurance.

Star Pupil 

At the end of each hire season, Buckmore hosts an annual 'Star Pupil' day, for the top drivers in all of its hire kart categories. The drivers participate in a mix of endurance and sprint events.

Two guest judges will decide the winner based not only on track performance but also on their punctuality to race briefings, courtesy and general behaviour off of the track.

Carl Tebbutt won the event in 2006 with Simon Rudd winning the following year. Jack Harding won in 2008, Terry Waller in 2009 and most recently in the 2010 star pupil, Matt Jones was judged the winner. Terry Waller was again the winner in 2011. Simon Rudd returned as the winner in the 2012 competition. In 2013, the event was won by Paul Janes. The 2014 event was sponsored by MINI Challenge and was won by Piers Prior, who also won the event in 2015.

Buckmore have now added Rookie of the Year and both Junior and Bambino Star Pupil events.

History 
The circuit saw its inception in the early 1960s when local businessman Cecil Whitehead, a keen supporter of the Scouts, saw the opportunity to allow them to participate in the fast growing pastime of kart racing by developing a track at the woodland site that the local scouts were leasing at the top of Bluebell Hill, Buckmore Park Scout Centre. Whitehead consulted with the designer of the Rye House Kart Circuit, Doug Jest, the local Rochester Motor Club and Camberley Kart Club to design the 400m circuit. Whitehead then approached the Royal School of Military Engineering in nearby Chatham and persuaded them to build the circuit as an engineering training exercise. The circuit subsequently opened in 1963 at no cost to the scouts.

During the 1970s the track was used by the scouts, visitors to the park and the Rochester Motor Club but had fallen into disrepair by the 1980s due to the scouts not having enough money to maintain it. Whitehead was about to close the circuit due to safety concerns when, in 1985, new owners were found and redevelopment of the track began with their priority being to gain an MSA competition circuit licence in order to make the circuit commercially viable. After extensive restoration and resurfacing, the circuit began staging events again, with the first RACMSA event taking place in 1989. The circuit staged its first national championship in 1992 and in 1994 the track was extended to 900m. The track length was extended again in 1999 to bring it up to full international length and around the same time the unmade access road was replaced with a tarmac road. In 2003 a new £1.25m clubhouse was opened by Stirling Moss, Bernie Ecclestone and circuit part-owner John Surtees.

Surtees, already the landowner of the circuit, bought out other interests and took full commercial control of the circuit for an undisclosed sum in April 2015.

Lap records 
Hire-Kart = https://www.buckmore.co.uk/lap-records
Owner Driver = http://www.buckmoreparkkartclub.co.uk/results-reports/lap-records/

See also 
Kart racing
Kart circuits

References

External links 
Buckmore Park Karting

Tourist attractions in Kent
Kart circuits